Krishnajirao III (12 May 1932 – 21 January 1999), belonging to the Puar dynasty of the Marathas, was the third and last reigning Maharaja of Dewas State (senior), reigning from 23 March 1947 to 27 June 1948. The only son of Sir Vikramsinhrao, Maharaja of Dewas, he was 15 years old when his father abdicated to become Chhatrapati Shahaji II Bhonsle, Maharaja of Kolhapur. As such, he ruled Dewas under the regency of his mother, Maharani Pramilabai (born 4 August 1910) for the brief time between his succession and Indian independence on 15 August 1947. On 27 June 1948, Dewas and other Maratha kingdoms merged to form the Madhya Bharat Union. Derecognised by the Government of India in 1971 as a ruler, he lived a quiet life until his death at the age of 66 on 21 January 1999. He was succeeded by his only son, Tukojirao IV.

Titles
1932-1947: Yuvaraja Shrimant Krishnajirao Vikramsinhrao Maharaj Puar
1947-1999: His Highness Kshatriya Kulavatana Sena Sapta Sahasri Senapati Pratinidhi, Maharaja Shrimant Krishnajirao III Puar, Maharaja of Dewas (Senior)

Honours
Indian Independence Medal-1947

See also
 Maratha Empire
 List of Maratha dynasties and states
 List of Indian princely states
 Shahaji II
 Tukojirao III
 Dewas State
 Dhar State

References

Maharajas of Madhya Pradesh
Pretenders
1932 births
1999 deaths
People from Dewas